After the Republic of China's central government fled to Taiwan in 1949, the government enacted a series of land reforms movements on the island throughout the 1950s and 1960s. The reforms occurred in three main successive stages. First, in 1949, farm rents were capped at 37.5% of yields through the 37.5% Arable Rent Reduction Act. Second, starting in 1951, public land was sold to tenant farmers. Third, starting in 1953, large landholdings were broken up and redistributed to tenant farmers in what's dubbed as the "Land to the Tiller" reform. 

The Taiwanese government finds land reform highly attractive due to the government's ideological origin: the founding father of the Republic of China Sun Yat-sen, who is influenced by Georgism, has proclaimed Equalization of Land Rights to be foundational to his political platform. The course of action was further made attractive, by Taiwan's reversion from Japanese rule in 1945: many of the Japanese large landowners had fled, and the non-Japanese large landowners can be compensated with Japanese commercial and industrial properties the government seized. The land program succeeded also because the Kuomintang were mostly from Mainland China and so had few ties to the remaining indigenous landowners. The success of the reforms are also highly dependent on the Sino-American Joint Commission on Rural Reconstruction or JCRR, an organization created by the U.S.'s China Aid Act of 1948. The JCRR channeled a vast amount of American aid into agriculture, coordinated with the Taiwan government to pass land reform acts, and designated programs that contributed directly to agriculture. 

The Taiwanese land reform is largely considered to be successful; it yielded strong results in the improvement of life quality in rural Taiwan and facilitated Taiwan's transition from sharecropping based agriculture to landowner-farmer based agriculture.

See also
 Land reform
 Land Bank of Taiwan
 Land Reform Museum

References

External links
 
 

Taiwan
Reform in Taiwan